Gannett is an American media holding company.

Gannett may also refer to:

Geography
Gannett Peak, mountain peak in Wyoming, United States
Gannett, Idaho, community in Blaine County, Idaho
Gannett Glacier, glacier in the Rocky Mountains within the United States

People
Gannett (surname), a surname

Business
Gannett Building, historic industrial and commercial building in Monroe County, New York, United States
Gannett Digital, division of Gannett Company
Gannett Fleming,  American-based engineering firm
Guy Gannett Communications, a defunct media company headquartered in Maine, United States
Tegna Inc., the company known as Gannett until 2015 that now holds broadcasting and digital assets

See also
Gannet (disambiguation)